Viryal shevlisem ( (patches of light,  (Virjal) - riding Chuvashs) is an interregional festival of performers of the Chuvash variety song, carried out annually at the beginning of summer in Alikovo's village (the Alikovsky District of the Chuvash republic).

Founders: The culture, nationalities, information policy and archival business ministry of the Chuvash Republic, administration of the Alikovsky District.

History
The festival has arisen in 1997 as regional review-competition of the Chuvash variety song. Winning in the course of time more and more admirers it has taken a place appropriate to in cultural space of area and being recognized far outside of republic, became more and more appreciable event in musical life of Chuvash Republic.

The holiday of variety creativity on the scene collects every year the increasing number of contestants, expanding popularity. During the existence the festival has accepted more than 2500 participants at the age from 5 till 40 years.

The festival «Virjal шевлисем» is not only competitive program, but also surprising atmosphere of creative enthusiasm.

See also
Valinke - Chuvash National ensemble
Alikovo middle school
Alikovsky regional literary-museum
Alikovsky regional palace of culture
Alikovo folk theater

External links
 Фотографии с XIII Межрегионального фестиваля чувашской эстрадной песни "Виръял шевлисем"
 XIII Межрегиональный фестиваль чувашской эстрадной песни "Виръял шевлисем"
 «Вирьял шевли» фестиваль иртĕ

Music festivals in Russia
Alikovsky District
Music festivals established in 1997
Folk festivals in Russia
Chuvash culture
Indigenous peoples days